The Eclipse Comet of 1948, formally known as C/1948 V1, was an especially bright comet discovered during a solar eclipse on November 1, 1948.  Although there have been several comets that have been seen during solar eclipses, the Eclipse Comet of 1948 is perhaps the best-known; it was however, best viewed only from the Southern Hemisphere.

When it was first discovered during totality, it was already quite bright, at magnitude -2; as it was near perihelion, this was its peak brightness.  Its visibility  during morning twilight improved as it receded outward from the Sun; it peaked near zero magnitude, and at one point displayed a tail roughly 30 degrees in length, before falling below naked eye visibility by the end of December.

References

External links 
 Orbital simulation from JPL (Java) / Ephemeris

Non-periodic comets
1948 in science
19481101